60i may refer to:
 Vaxell 60i, a Polish aircraft engine
 60i, a broadcast video format

See also
Interlaced video
24p#60i to 24p conversions
Deinterlacing